The 1940 United States presidential election in Connecticut took place on November 5, 1940. All contemporary 48 states were part of the 1940 United States presidential election. State voters chose eight electors to the Electoral College, which selected the president and vice president.

Connecticut was won by popular incumbent Democratic President Franklin D. Roosevelt of New York, who was running against Republican businessman Wendell Willkie of New York. Roosevelt ran with Henry A. Wallace of Iowa as his running mate, and Willkie ran with Senator Charles L. McNary of Oregon.

Roosevelt won Connecticut by a comfortable margin of 7.14%, which made Connecticut 2.8% more Republican than the nation-at-large. As of 2022, this is the most recent election where Connecticut voted to the left of neighboring Massachusetts.

Results

By county

See also
 United States presidential elections in Connecticut

References

 

Connecticut
1940
1940 Connecticut elections